Spilt are a British rock band from Runcorn, England. Formed in 2016, the band consists of Morgan "Mo" Molyneux (vocals and guitar) Ben Cunliffe (bass), and Josh Cunningham (drums).

History 
Originally founded by Molyneux and Ayres in 2013 as Accepting April, the duo changed the band's name to Spilt in 2015, prior to Josh Cunningham joining the line-up in early 2016.

The band built a reputation playing around Liverpool and its satellite towns in the North of England prior to becoming nationally recognised following a series of high-profile gigs supporting Fidlar at the O2 Ritz Manchester, and London's Heaven venue.

Discography

Singles
 "Facemelter" (2017)
 "Catnip" (2018)
 "The Hungry Caterpillar" (2018)
 "Saliva" (2018)
 "Lalka" (2018)
 "Acid Baby" (2018)
 "1984" (2019)
 “Sex tape” (2021)
”Nomad” (2021)

EPs
 "Sickly Fit" (2019)

Albums
 No Ball Games (Stereo Mix) (2019)

References

English grunge groups